Achankunju (1930 - 16 January 1987) was an Indian actor in Malayalam cinema. He started his career in the 1980s, mainly portraying villainous roles. He acted in more than 50 films in Malayalam.

Background
Achankunju hails from the Nellissery family, Kacherikkadavu, Kottayam in Kerala. He is a Kerala State Film Award-winning actor in 1981 for the movie Lorry. He died on 16 January 1987 at the age of 56 at Kottayam. He was survived by his wife Achamma, a son, Shajan and a daughter, Esamma.

Awards
 1980 Kerala State Film Awards: Best Actor for Lorry
 1980 Kerala State Film Critics Award for Lorry

Filmography

 Arappatta Kettiya Gramathil (1986)
 Ithile Iniyum Varu (1986) as Govindankutty Ashan
 Meenamasathile Sooryan (1986) as Police officer
 Niramulla Raavukal (1986)
 Ilanjippookkal (1986)
 Nimishangal (Yaamam) (1986)
 Thozhil Allengil Jail (1985)
 Angadikkappurathu (1985) as Saithakka
 Kaanaathaaya Penkutti (1985)
 Thinkalaazhcha Nalla Divasam (1985)
 Yathra (1985)
 Naadam (Mattoru Pranayakaalathu) (1983)
 Sandhya Vandanam (1983) as Bhaskaran Aasan
 Sagaram Shantham (1983)
 Enikku Vishakunnu (1983) as Mathai
 Kadamba (1983)
 Naseema (Thamburu) (1983) as Mammad
 Aattakkalaasham (1983)
 Sandhya Mayangum Neram (1983)
 Prem Nazeerine Kaanmanilla (1983)
 Nizhal Moodiya Nirangal (1983)
 Himavaahini (1983) as Panthalam Kurup
 Ahimsa (1982)
 Padayottam (1982)
 Kakka (1982)
 Ee Nadu (1982) as Porinju
 Greeshmajwaala (1981) as Kattumooppan
 Parankimala (1981)
 Chaatta (1981) as Kariya
 Kaattukallan (1981)
 Choothaattam  (1981)
 Inayethedi (1981)
 Lorry (1980)

References

External links
Achankunju at MSI

Indian male film actors
Kerala State Film Award winners
Male actors from Kottayam
Male actors in Malayalam cinema
1987 deaths
1930 births
20th-century Indian male actors